Françoise Sullivan  LL.D (born 10 June 1923) is a Canadian painter, sculptor, dancer, choreographer and photographer whose work is marked by her ability to switch from one discipline to another.

Biography

Early life 
Françoise Sullivan grew up in Montreal, Quebec, the youngest child and only girl in a middle-class family with four boys. Her father was a lawyer who worked as the Deputy Minister of the Federal Post Office Department. Her father enjoyed poetry and both he and her mother encouraged her early interest in the arts by enrolling her in dance, theatre, and painting lessons.

Education 
Sullivan studied classical dance with Gérald Crevier from 1934 to 1945. She also took courses in visual arts, studying at Hochelaga Convent in 1939 and, at sixteen, began attending the École des beaux-arts de Montréal  from 1940 to 1944. Her early paintings were influenced by Fauvism and Cubism. In 1941 she came into contact with the Québecois painter Paul-Émile Borduas and members of the group Les Automatistes. Her friendship with Bourduas and the group influenced her paintings and performances in the following years. 
In 1948, Sullivan signed Les Automatistes' Refus Global manifesto, which included her essay La danse et l'espoir (Dance and Hope).

From 1945 to 1947, Sullivan lived in New York where she studied modern dance with Franziska Boas, the daughter of anthropologist Franz Boas. She also studied briefly with Martha Graham and Louis Horst. In 1949, Sullivan married the painter Paterson Ewen. Between 1952 and 1956, she worked as a dancer and choreographer for CBC television. In 1959, she studied metal welding under Armand Vaillancourt. She then returned to the École des Beaux-Arts de Montréal in 1960 to study under Louis Archambault.   In 1961, she studied at the École des arts et métiers in Lachine.

Career 
Sullivan returned to Montréal in 1947 and continued choreographing modern dance. In 1948, accompanied by Jean-Paul Riopelle and Maurice Perron, Sullivan performed Danse dans la neige (Dance in the Snow) outside in Otterburn Park, Quebec. Perron and Riopelle both documented the performance, however, only Perron's photographs remain as Riopelle's film footage was later lost. Like other members of Les Automatistes Sullivan was interested in 'psychic automatism' and Danse dans la neige was the second in a series of performances in which Sullivan improvised gestural movements to explore the seasons. Danse dans la neige is considered one of the most significant pieces of performance art in Canadian art history. The only score was the crunching of her own footsteps in the thickly crusted snow; her small audience consisted of Riopelle, Perron, their cameras, and the landscape itself. In 2007 Sullivan reworked her first two performances Summer and Danse dans la neige and completed two more choreographed dances which were filmed by Mario Côté to create Les Saisons Sullivan.

On the 3rd of April, 1948 Sullivan performed with her dance partner, Jeanne Renaud, at Ross House on the McGill University campus in Montréal. Their collaborative performance featured choreographed and improvised movements, accompanied by a poetry reading by Claude Gauvreau. This event is considered a significant moment in the history of modern dance in Québec.

In the late 1950s, Sullivan turned to sculpture under the guidance of Armand Vaillancourt and learned welding at École des arts et métiers in Lachine, Québec. Her work was soon recognized as some of the most important modern sculpture in Québec. In 1960, she took a three-month course in sculpture with Louis Archambault at the École des beaux-arts de Montréal where she learned how to work with wood, iron, and plaster. In 1967 Sullivan received multiple commissions for monumental public sculpture. One, Callooh Callay, was installed on the fairgrounds of Expo 67,  and the other, Aeris Ludus, was exhibited as part of Sculpture '67 at Nathan Phillips Square. In the late 1960s, Sullivan and Ewen experimented with plexiglass. In 1976, the couple collaborated with the sculptor David Moore on a work for the infamous Corridart exhibit. The work, Legend of Artists, used a series of vitrines and didactic panels to illuminate the rich history of art and artists' lives in the city. When Jean Drapeau ordered Corridart dismantled, Sullivan was one of the twelve artists who sued the city, a case that took twelve years to win.

During the 1980s, Sullivan returned to painting. Between 1982 and 1994, she produced several series, which are regarded as the culmination of her work in this medium.  These series include the Cretan Cycle (1983–85), the Hommages (2002-03), and the Tondos (1980s). In 1997, she completed Montagnes (Mountains), a granite wall located in the main lobby of President Kennedy Pavilion of Université du Québec à Montréal. Montagnes is the only permanently installed Sullivan sculpture. In 2000, UQAM awarded her an honorary doctorate. Since 1997, Sullivan has taught painting at Concordia University. In 2001, she was appointed a Member of the Order of Canada and the Musée d'art contemporain de Montréal held a retrospective of her work.

In 2023, the Montreal Museum of Fine Arts will celebrate her 100th birthday with a show of recent work. The exhibition also will draw attention to the important representation of Sullivan’s work – close to 50 artworks – in the Museum collection.

Honours 

 1943 – Prix Maurice Cullen from École des beaux-arts de Montréal
 1963 – Prix du Québec, Sculpture
 1981 – Second prize- Segal Centre for Performing Arts Biennial
 1983 – Victor Martyn Lynch-Staunton Award from the Canada Council
 1987 – Prix Paul-Émile-Borduas
 1990 – Member of the Royal Canadian Academy of Arts
 1998 – Honorary doctorate from York University
 2000 – Honorary doctorate from Université du Québec à Montréal
 2001 – Member of Order of Canada
 2002 – Knight of the National Order of Quebec
 2005 – Governor General of Canada in Visual and Media Arts

References

Further reading 
 Gérin, Annie. Françoise Sullivan: Life & Work. Toronto: Art Canada Institute, 2018. 
"Heralding choreographic modernism". 1994. Studies in Dance History. 5 (2): 45–64.
 Lindgren, Allana. 1999. ""La danse et l'espoir": Françoise Sullivan and the Quebec automatist movement". Proceedings. 155–159. 
 Lindgren, Allana. 2003. From automatism to modern dance: Françoise Sullivan with Franziska Boas in New York. Toronto: Dance Collection Danse Press/es.
 Odom, Selma Landen. 2004. Canadian dance: visions and stories. Toronto: Dance Collection Danse Press/es
 Sullivan, Françoise. 1981. Françoise Sullivan: rétrospective : Musée d'art contemporain, Montréal, 19 novembre 1981-3 janvier 1982 : une exposition. Québec: Ministère des affaires culturelles.

1923 births
Canadian contemporary dancers
Canadian female dancers
Canadian choreographers
20th-century Canadian painters
21st-century Canadian painters
Artists from Montreal
Canadian sculptors
Knights of the National Order of Quebec
Living people
20th-century sculptors
20th-century Canadian women artists
Canadian conceptual artists
Women conceptual artists
21st-century Canadian women artists
École des beaux-arts de Montréal alumni
21st-century Canadian dancers
20th-century Canadian dancers
Canadian women choreographers
Canadian expatriates in the United States
Officers of the Order of Canada